Cosmic (stylized in all caps) is the debut studio album by American singer-songwriter Bazzi, released on April 12, 2018 through Bazzi's imprint, iamcosmic, and Atlantic.

The album has peaked at number 14 on the US Billboard 200 chart and has been listed on a variety of international charts. The album was further affected by the commercial success of "Mine", which peaked at number 11 on the Billboard Hot 100.

Background
Bazzi released several tracks in 2016 and 2017, including "Alone", "Beautiful", and "Sober." In October 2017, he released "Mine" via Atlantic Records. That song increased in popularity after it was used as a Snapchat lens filter in January 2018. It peaked at number 11 on the Billboard Hot 100 chart. On March 22, 2018, Bazzi announced the release date for his debut album as April 12. This came after the release of three more singles, "Why?," "Gone," and "Honest." On August 2, 2018, he released a remix of "Beautiful" featuring Cuban-American singer Camila Cabello.

Commercial performance
COSMIC entered the Billboard 200 at number 35 in its first week after release. It has since peaked at number 14 on the list. It has also charted on a variety of international charts including at number 65 in the United Kingdom, number 13 in Canada, and number 14 in Denmark.

Track listing
All tracks written by Andrew Bazzi, except where noted. All tracks produced by Rice N' Peas and Bazzi, except where noted. Credits adapted from Tidal and Genius.

Notes

 "Mirror" contains an interpolation of "Crazy Love" by Van Morrison.

Charts

Weekly charts

Year-end charts

Certifications

References

2018 debut albums
Atlantic Records albums
Bazzi (singer) albums